Hannibal Square Library was a library established to serve the black community in Winter Park, Florida that operated from 1937 to 1979.

History

Hannibal Square neighborhood 
In 1881, the neighborhood Hannibal Square was officially founded in Winter Park. It was home to black families who worked for white residents and visitors and in the railroad or service industry.

On October 12, 1887, an election was scheduled in incorporate Winter Park formerly as a town. Residents debated whether Hannibal Square should be included in the city's bounds. Neighborhood resident Gus C. Henderson rallied his neighbors to vote, establishing a quorum and allowing the city to incorporate with the neighborhood in its bounds. Walter B. Simpson and Frank R. Israel were elected to the town council and, as of 2020, are the only people of color to ever hold an elected office in the city. They served until 1893 when William C. Comstock successfully petitioned the state legislature to remove the neighborhood from Winter Park's boundaries. In 1925, the neighborhood was reincorporated into Winter Park, as the city wanted the change its status from town to city.

In the 1990s, the neighborhood began to see gentrification as black-owned businesses moved out and boutiques and upscale eateries moved in. In 2007, the Hannibal Square Heritage Center was established by the Crealdé School of Art to preserve and represent the neighborhood's history.

Library 
In 1936, Mertie Graham Grover, a former teacher, died in Winter Park. Her husband, Rollins College professor Dr. Edwin O. Grover, started a fund to build a library on her behalf in the Hannibal Square neighborhood. The Hannibal Square Public Library-Mertie Graham Grover Memorial opened on July 1, 1937. In the 1950s, the library began to receive some funding from the city, although less than the public library received. In 1962 and 1963, the Winter Park Public Library changed its policies to allow all residents, regardless of race, to access its library services. In 1968, Hannibal Square Library became a branch of the Winter Park Public Library. In 1979, the Hannibal Square library closed when the 460 East New England Avenue library opened.

References

Further reading 

 Peter Schreyer (2016). The Hannibal Square Heritage Collection: Photographs and Oral Histories. The Florida Historical Society Press. ISBN 978-1886104860

External links 

 Hannibal Square Heritage Center website
 Winter Park Library archives on Winter Park's West Side neighborhood

Library buildings completed in 1937
Libraries in Florida
Buildings and structures in Winter Park, Florida
Former library buildings in the United States
Libraries established in 1937
Libraries disestablished in 1979